Cannabis in Colombia is legal for medicinal purposes since 2016 and it is partially decriminalized for recreational purposes since 1994.

History

Cannabis has been cultivated in Colombia since the late colonial period, when hemp was grown for its industrial fibres. However even at that early state, cannabis was recognized for its psychoactive uses, but these remained largely confined to the fringes of Colombian society, and discouraged by the Catholic church and national law. By the 1920s, possibly spurred by wider cannabis use in the Caribbean, recreational use of cannabis emerged in the Atlantic ports, particularly Barranquilla, leading the Colombian government to further restrict cannabis in 1939 and 1946.

In the 1960s and 1970s, North American cannabis traffickers made inroads into Colombia, leading to booming production in the Sierra Nevada de Santa Marta and the Urabá peninsula, where cannabis was smuggled in the region's massive northward shipments of bananas.

According to the academic Steven Bender, marijuana from Colombia is known as "Colombian", as referenced in the American rock duo Steely Dan's 1980 song "Hey Nineteen".

Decriminalization

In 1994 the Constitutional Court of Colombia ruled that possession of cannabis and other drugs in amounts for personal use was legal.  In 2012 the Colombian government officially decriminalized the possession of up to 20 grams of cannabis. In 2015 the Colombian Supreme Court ruled that cultivation of up to 20 cannabis plants was allowed.

Medical cannabis
In 2015, president Juan Manuel Santos signed legislation allowing cannabis and derivatives for medical uses, and establishing guidelines for dispensaries.

References

Further reading
 https://www.economist.com/news/americas/21703415-drug-growing-country-experiments-medical-marijuana-weeds-peace
 https://hightimes.com/culture/inside-colombias-legal-weed-scene/

 
Politics of Colombia